Plaine Magnien is a village in southeast Mauritius located in the Grand Port District.

Landmarks
The sole airport of Mauritius, Sir Seewoosagur Ramgoolam International Airport, is located in the village of Plaine Magnien. 

In addition, it is the birthplace of the former Governor-General of Mauritius, Dayendranath Burrenchobay.

Plaine Magnien has an all girls State Secondary School, France Boyer de la Giroday SSS. 

Saint Esprit Prestige Store, one of the most popular retail store of the village,  is found on the main road near the Mauritius Commercial bank.

See also 
 List of airports in Mauritius
 List of places in Mauritius

Transportation Service 
Car rental Mauritius Pingouin Car Rental Mauritius Agency at SSR International Airport, Plaine Magnien, Mauritius.

References 

Grand Port District
Populated places in Mauritius